Judith Harriet Bumpus (née Collison, born 3 November 1939 – 2 March 2010) was a British radio producer for the BBC, specialising in coverage of the arts, particularly the work of visual artists.

Born in Wiltshire, Collinson was educated at the University of St Andrews, where she read German and Spanish, and universities in Spain, Bumpus joined the BBC in 1968. For nearly thirty years, she worked on documentaries, mainly broadcast on Radio 3, and produced the long running Conversations with Artists series of interviews conducted by the poet and art critic Edward Lucie-Smith.

Judith Collinson married the historian of ceramics Bernard Bumpus (1921–2004) in 1966; the couple had two daughters.

References

1939 births
2010 deaths
Alumni of the University of St Andrews
British radio producers
Women radio producers